The Lethbridge Maple Leafs were, at times, a senior, intermediate, and junior ice hockey team that operated out of Lethbridge, Alberta. They are best known for winning the 1951 World Ice Hockey Championships.

The Maple Leafs were a men's senior ice hockey team from Lethbridge, Alberta formed in 1936, playing in the Alberta Senior Hockey League. After World War II, the Maple Leafs played in the Western Canada Senior Hockey League. In 1950, they captured the Western Canadian Championship. The Maple Leafs were selected to represent Canada at the 1951 World Championships in Paris, France. Coached by Dick Gray, the Maple Leafs won the gold medal, following which they embarked on a European tour. They entered the first Sir Winston Churchill Cup Competition, winning the gold medal. During their European tour, they played 62 games winning 51, tying 4, and losing 7 of them. The team's tour was overseen by Frank Sargent, a past-president of the Canadian Amateur Hockey Association. He stated the Lethbridge Maple Leafs were the best goodwill ambassadors the Canada could have had, describing them as gentlemanly and well-behaved.

The 1951 Lethbridge Maple Leafs team was inducted to the Alberta Sports Hall of Fame in 1974.

Senior team

West Kootenay League (1937-38)
1937-38: 2nd in East, Lost Semi Final

Alberta Senior Hockey League (1938-42)
1938-39: 1st, Won Final, Lost West Semi-Final	
1939-40: 2nd, Lost Semi Final	
1940-41: 1st, Won Final, Lost West Final	
1941-42: 2nd, Won Final, Lost West Semi-Final

Western Canada Senior Hockey League (1946-49)
1946-47: 3rd, Lost Final	
1947-48: 4th, Lost Semi-Final	
1948-49: 4th, Lost Semi-Final

Intermediate team
The Maple Leafs won the provincial titles in 1936-37 and 1949–50, In both these years they won the Western Canada title as well.

Their 1949-50 title led to them being chosen as Canada's representative in the 1951 World Ice Hockey Championships. Prior to that competition they went on a European tour. They then won the World Championship. The team continued to compete into the late 1950s.

1951 World Championship roster
 Ken Branch
 Bill Chandler
 Dinny Flanagan
 Bill Flick
 Bill Gibson
 Dick Gray (Coach)
 Mallie Hughes
 Bert Knibbs
 Jim Malacko
 Robert McGregor
 Don McLean
 Nap Milroy
 Hector Negrello
 Stan Obodiac
 Walter Rimstad
 Mickey Roth
 Lou Siray
 Carl Sorokoski
 Jack Sumner
 Don Vogan
 Tom Wood

NHL alumni
Thirteen alumni of the Lethbridge Maple Leafs also played in the National Hockey League.
 Viv Allen
 Garth Boesch
 Jack Evans
 Joe Fisher
 Bing Juckes
 Alex Kaleta
 Bob Kirkpatrick
 Odie Lowe
 Jake Milford
 Tony Savage
 Sweeney Schriner
 Peter Slobodian
 Ken Stewart

See also
Alberta-British Columbia Senior League

References

Alberta Senior Hockey League

Defunct ice hockey teams in Canada
Ice hockey teams in Alberta
Senior ice hockey teams
Sport in Lethbridge
Ice hockey teams representing Canada internationally
1936 establishments in Alberta
Ice hockey clubs established in 1936